Prince Edward, Duke of Edinburgh,   (Edward Antony Richard Louis; born 10 March 1964) is the youngest child of Queen Elizabeth II and Prince Philip, Duke of Edinburgh, and the youngest sibling of King Charles III. Edward is 13th in line of succession to the British throne.

Born at Buckingham Palace, Edward studied at Heatherdown School and earned his A-Levels at Gordonstoun before spending a part of his gap year teaching at the Whanganui Collegiate School in New Zealand. He studied at Jesus College, Cambridge, and graduated from the University of Cambridge in 1986 with a Bachelor of Arts degree in history. After a brief stint in the Royal Marines, Edward worked as a theatre production assistant at the Really Useful Theatre Company before assisting in television production. He later formed his own company, Ardent Productions.

Edward stepped down from the company in 2002 to begin full-time duties as a working member of the royal family, and undertook engagements on behalf of Queen Elizabeth II. He holds patronage within over 70 charities and organisations, including the National Youth Theatre, the Sport and Recreation Alliance and the British Paralympic Association. His charity work focuses on the arts, athletics, and the development of the Duke of Edinburgh's Award, which centres around fitness, wellbeing and community service.

Edward was made Earl of Wessex prior to marrying Sophie Rhys-Jones in 1999. The couple have two children: Lady Louise Mountbatten-Windsor and James Mountbatten-Windsor, Earl of Wessex. Edward was conferred the additional title of Earl of Forfar in 2019. He was created Duke of Edinburgh for his lifetime on his 59th birthday, a title previously held by his father and briefly by his eldest brother, Charles, after their father's death.

Early life and education 

Prince Edward was born at 8:20 p.m. on 10 March 1964 at Buckingham Palace, London, as the third son and the fourth and youngest child of Queen Elizabeth II and Prince Philip, Duke of Edinburgh. His birth was the only one witnessed by his father. He was baptised on 2 May 1964 in the private chapel at Windsor Castle.

As with his three older siblings, Charles, Anne, and Andrew, a governess was appointed to look after Edward and was responsible for his early education at Buckingham Palace before he attended Collingham College, Kensington (then known as Gibbs School). In September 1972, he joined Heatherdown School, near Ascot in Berkshire. Later, as his father and elder brothers had done before him, he moved to Gordonstoun in northern Scotland, and was appointed head boy in his last term. Edward obtained a C-grade in English and two D-grades in history and politics at A-level, and after leaving school spent a gap year abroad, working as a house tutor and junior master for two terms at the Wanganui Collegiate School in New Zealand.

Upon his return to Britain, Edward studied at Jesus College, Cambridge, where he read history. His admission to Cambridge despite his A-Level results caused some controversy. Edward graduated in 1986 with a Bachelor of Arts degree (lower second class honours).

Post-university

Royal Marines
Upon leaving university in 1986, Edward joined the Royal Marines, who had reportedly sponsored his tuition at Cambridge on condition of future service. He had signed on to join the Marines in September 1983. In January 1987, he dropped out of the commando course having completed one-third of the 12-month training. Media reported that Prince Philip, who was the Captain General Royal Marines, was displeased, but Prince Edward later said that his father had not put undue pressure on him to change his mind. Others stated that Philip was the most sympathetic family member toward his son's decision. Buckingham Palace said that Prince Edward's decision came after "much consideration" and that he was leaving with great regret "but has concluded that he does not wish to make the service his long-term career".

Theatre and television
After leaving the Marines, Edward opted for a career in entertainment. He commissioned the 1986 musical Cricket from Andrew Lloyd Webber and Tim Rice, for his mother's 60th birthday celebration, which led to a job offer at Lloyd Webber's Really Useful Theatre Company, where he worked as a production assistant on musicals such as The Phantom of the Opera, Starlight Express, and Cats. While there he met actress Ruthie Henshall, whom he dated for three years.

Edward's first foray into television production was the programme The Grand Knockout Tournament, informally known as It's a Royal Knockout, on 15 June 1987, in which four teams sponsored by him, the Princess Royal and the Duke and Duchess of York competed for charity. The programme was criticised by the media and the public, and it was later reported that the Queen was not in favour of the event, with her courtiers having advised against it. The programme raised over £1,500,000 for its selected charities.

Ardent Productions
In 1993, Edward formed the television production company Ardent Productions. Ardent was involved in the production of a number of documentaries and dramas, but Edward was accused in the media of using his royal connections for financial gain, and the company was referred to by some industry insiders as "a sad joke" due to a perceived lack of professionalism in its operations. Andy Beckett, writing in The Guardian, opined that "to watch Ardent's few dozen hours of broadcast output is to enter a strange kingdom where every man in Britain still wears a tie, where pieces to camera are done in cricket jumpers, where people clasp their hands behind their backs like guardsmen. Commercial breaks are filled with army recruiting advertisements".

Ardent's productions were better received in the United States and a documentary Edward made about his great uncle, Edward VIII (the late Duke of Windsor) in 1996, sold well worldwide. Nonetheless, the company reported losses every year it operated, with the exception of one when Edward did not draw a salary. An Ardent two-man film crew later allegedly invaded the privacy of Edward's nephew, Prince William, in September 2001, when he was studying at the University of St Andrews, which went against industry guidelines regarding the privacy of members of the royal family; William's father (Edward's elder brother Charles) was reportedly angered by the incident. In March 2002, Edward announced that he would step down as production director and joint managing director of Ardent to concentrate on his public duties and to support the Queen during her Golden Jubilee year. Ardent Productions was voluntarily dissolved in June 2009, with assets reduced to just £40.

Marriage and children

Edward met Sophie Rhys-Jones for the first time in 1987 when he was dating her friend. They met again at a promotion shoot for the Prince Edward Summer Challenge to raise money for charity in 1993, and the two began their relationship soon afterwards. In December 1993 and amid growing speculation about whether they were planning to marry, Edward wrote a letter to newspaper editors, in which he denied any wedding plans and asked the media to respect their privacy. Edward proposed to Sophie at a holiday in the Bahamas in December 1998 and their engagement was announced on 6 January 1999. Edward proposed to Sophie with an Asprey and Garrard engagement ring worth an estimated £105,000: a two-carat oval diamond flanked by two heart-shaped gemstones set in 18-karat white gold.

Their wedding took place on 19 June 1999 in St George's Chapel at Windsor Castle. This was a departure from the weddings of his elder brothers, which were large, formal events at Westminster Abbey or St Paul's Cathedral, and had ended in divorce. On his wedding day, Prince Edward was created Earl of Wessex, with the subsidiary title of Viscount Severn (derived from the Welsh roots of the Countess's family), breaking from a tradition whereby sons of the sovereign were created royal dukes.

Sophie had an ectopic pregnancy in 2001. Edward and Sophie have two children: Lady Louise Mountbatten-Windsor, born prematurely on 8 November 2003 due to a sudden placental abruption; and James Mountbatten-Windsor (then Viscount Severn, now Earl of Wessex), born on 17 December 2007. Edward's children are styled as the children of a duke, rather than as prince/ss and royal highness. The family's country residence is Bagshot Park; their office and official London residence is at Buckingham Palace.

Activities

The Earl and Countess of Wessex established their foundation, the Wessex Youth Trust, in 1999, with a focus on helping, supporting and advancing registered charities which provide opportunities specifically for children and young people. His patronages include: the British Paralympic Association, the International Real Tennis Professionals Association, the Commonwealth Games Federation, BadmintonScotland, the Tennis and Rackets Association, City of Birmingham Symphony Orchestra and Chorus, London Mozart Players, Haddo House Choral and Operatic Society, Northern Ballet, the Edinburgh International Festival, the Royal Birmingham Conservatoire, the Production Guild, and the National Youth Theatre.

The Earl of Wessex assumed many duties from his father, Prince Philip, Duke of Edinburgh, as the Duke reduced his commitments and retired from royal duties. Prince Edward opened the 1990 Commonwealth Games in New Zealand and the 1998 Commonwealth Games in Malaysia and became vice-patron of Commonwealth Games Federation in 2006, picking up his father's ceremonial duties who had served as president. He has also taken over his father's role in the Duke of Edinburgh's Award (DofE) scheme, attending Gold Award ceremonies around the world.

In September 2007, the Earl visited Israel in his capacity as chair of the International Council of the Duke of Edinburgh's Award to attend a number of events organised by the Israel Youth Award program, an affiliate of the Duke of Edinburgh's Award. Edward was himself a recipient of the award's gold medal in 1986 for "a 60-mile, four-day trek from Blair Atholl to Tomintoul" that he had planned. He has been a trustee of the DofE since 1988 and of the International Award since 2006. Edward later went on to become chairman of trustees of the Duke of Edinburgh's International Award in 2015, and was named patron of the Duke of Edinburgh's Award in 2023. He has promoted the charity's work on different occasions. Edward is also a trustee of the International Award Association, which "encompasses the DofE UK and all its other 61 National Award Authorities across the globe". He was also chair of its international council and in 1999 founded the International Special Projects Group "to provide a capital fund to broaden the reach of the Award". In 2018, Edward, as patron of the Tennis and Rackets Association, played on all 50 real tennis courts around the world and raised over £2 million for the Duke of Edinburgh's Award scheme.

In June 2011, Edward visited Baltimore to meet the students and staff of the Living Classrooms Foundation and encourage them to participate in the Duke of Edinburgh's Award's programme. In December 2011, the Earl and Countess of Wessex visited troops in Afghanistan. On the same trip, the royal couple visited Bahrain, and received two gifts of jewels from the Bahraini royal family and Prime Minister. Given concern about human rights abuses in Bahrain, this gift attracted controversy, with calls for the jewels to be sold, and the proceeds used for the benefit of the Bahraini people. In February and March 2012, the couple visited the Caribbean for the Queen's Diamond Jubilee. The itinerary consisted of Saint Lucia; Barbados, Saint Vincent and the Grenadines; Grenada; Trinidad and Tobago; Montserrat; Saint Kitts and Nevis; Anguilla; Antigua and Barbuda. Highlights included Independence Day celebrations in Saint Lucia, addressing Senate and Assembly of Barbados jointly, and a visit to sites affected by the volcanic eruptions in Montserrat.

In 2013, the couple visited South Africa. The Queen appointed the Earl of Wessex as Lord High Commissioner to the General Assembly of the Church of Scotland for 2014. In 2015, for his contributions to projects associated with badminton, Edward was awarded the President's Medal by the Badminton World Federation President Poul-Erik Høyer. In May 2016, the Earl visited Ghana. Alongside President Mahama, he presented young people with the Head of State Awards for their participation in the Duke of Edinburgh's International Award Scheme. In September 2016, Edward travelled to Chile as a part of the Duke of Edinburgh's Award's diamond anniversary, and visited projects by British and Commonwealth Fire and Rescue Company and Chilean-British Culture University, of which he is an honorary member and patron respectively. The Earl and Countess of Wessex represented the Queen at the 50th Anniversary Celebrations of Sultan Hassanal Bolkiah's Accession to the Throne of Brunei in October 2017. In February 2018, the Earl and Countess toured Sri Lanka, participating in the 70th Independence Day celebrations in Colombo. In April 2018, the Earl visited Australia to attend the XXI Commonwealth Games and attend fundraising events for those participating in the Duke of Edinburgh Award challenges.

Twenty years after its inception, the Wessex Youth Trust changed its name to the Earl and Countess of Wessex Charitable Trust, managed by the private office of the Earl and Countess of Wessex and Forfar. The trust will continue to develop sustainable relationships with a range of selected partner charities, and will expand its remit beyond supporting children and young people.

In July 2019, the Earl and Countess visited Forfar on their first official visit to the town since the Queen granted the Earl the additional title Earl of Forfar in March 2019. The Earl was presented with 'Earl of Forfar' tartan, which was designed by Forfar's Strathmore Woollen Company to celebrate their new titles. In 2020, he took over the patronage of London Youth from his father who had held the position for 73 years.

In February 2022, Edward was appointed president of the Royal Windsor Horse Show, a position previously held by his father Prince Philip, Duke of Edinburgh. In the following month, he visited Kenya to oversee the progress of The Duke of Edinburgh's International Award in the country. In April 2022, the Earl and Countess of Wessex and Forfar toured Saint Lucia, Saint Vincent and the Grenadines, and Antigua and Barbuda to mark the Queen's Platinum Jubilee. Their planned visit to Grenada was postponed after talks with the island's government and governor general, and the couple expressed their hopes to visit the country on a later date. In 2022 and in recognition of his role as patron of the Production Guild, the Earl of Wessex Award was created as part of the guild's inaugural Talent Showcase to recognise UK film and TV organisations who have created "a successful way of inspiring local talent or skills, widening access or being more inclusive." After he was created Duke of Edinburgh on his 59th birthday, Edward and Sophie visited Edinburgh to meet with members of the Ukrainian and Eastern European communities in the city, some of whom were displaced following the Russian invasion of Ukraine. Edward was made patron of the The Duke of Edinburgh's Award following his creation as Duke.

In the media
In 2011, close associates of Jonathan Rees, a private investigator connected to the News International phone hacking scandal, stated that he had penetrated Edward and Sophie's bank accounts and sold details about them to the Sunday Mirror.

Titles, styles, honours and arms

Titles and styles

Until his marriage, Edward was known as "His Royal Highness The Prince Edward".  Royal commentators conjectured that former royal dukedoms such as Cambridge or Sussex might be granted to him. Instead, on 19 June 1999 he became "His Royal Highness The Earl of Wessex". He was the first prince since the Tudors to be created an earl rather than a duke (while reserving the rank of duke for the future). The Sunday Telegraph reported that he was drawn to the Earldom of Wessex after watching the 1998 film Shakespeare in Love, in which a minor character with that title was played by Colin Firth. Edward was also granted the subsidiary title of Viscount Severn. Buckingham Palace announced the intention that Edward would eventually be created Duke of Edinburgh, a title then held by his father, Prince Philip, once it had merged in the Crown upon the death of both his parents.

On 10 March 2019, his 55th birthday, Edward was granted the additional title of Earl of Forfar for use in Scotland. He was at times referred to as the Earl of Wessex and Forfar, such as at the funeral of his father and the state funeral of his mother.

On his 59th birthday in 2023, Edward was created Duke of Edinburgh, and is thus known as "His Royal Highness The Duke of Edinburgh". This title is not hereditary and will revert to the Crown on his death.

Honours

  6 February 1977: Queen Elizabeth II Silver Jubilee Medal
  9 February 1990: New Zealand Commemorative Medal
  6 February 2002: Queen Elizabeth II Golden Jubilee Medal
  11 May 2005: Honorary Member of the Saskatchewan Order of Merit (SOM)
  7 June 2005: Commemorative Medal for the Centennial of Saskatchewan
  23 April 2006: Royal Knight of the Most Noble Order of the Garter (KG)
  10 March 2011: Knight Grand Cross of the Royal Victorian Order (GCVO)
 2 June 2003 10 March 2011: Knight Commander of the Royal Victorian Order (KCVO)
 10 March 1989 2 June 2003: Commander of the Royal Victorian Order (CVO)
  6 February 2012: Queen Elizabeth II Diamond Jubilee Medal
  29 October 2015: Canadian Forces' Decoration
  6 February 2022: Queen Elizabeth II Platinum Jubilee Medal

Other Commonwealth countries
  5 October 2017: Sultan of Brunei Golden Jubilee Medal

Military appointments
 October 1986January 1987: Officer Cadet, Royal Marines
 1 August 2004present: Personal Aide-de-Camp to the Sovereign

Honorary military appointments
 Canada
 2002: Colonel-in-Chief of the Hastings and Prince Edward Regiment
 2003: Colonel-in-Chief of the Saskatchewan Dragoons
 2005: Colonel-in-Chief of the Prince Edward Island Regiment
 2007: Honorary Deputy Commissioner of the Royal Canadian Mounted Police

 United Kingdom
 19 August 2003: Royal Honorary Colonel of the Royal Wessex Yeomanry
 2006: Commodore-in-Chief of the Royal Fleet Auxiliary
 2007: Royal Colonel of 2nd Battalion, The Rifles
 2008: Honorary Air Commodore of Royal Air Force Waddington
 1 May 2011: Royal Honorary Colonel of the London Regiment
1 May 2022: London Regiment re-designated as London Guards

Civic appointments
 2008: Liveryman Honoris Causa, Worshipful Company of Haberdashers
 2008: Liveryman Honoris Causa, Worshipful Company of Gardeners
 2011: Freeman of the City of London
 2011: Member, Court of Assistants, Worshipful Company of Haberdashers
 2011: Member, Court of Assistants, Worshipful Company of Gardeners
 2011: Liveryman Honoris Causa, Worshipful Company of Fuellers
 2013: Master, Worshipful Company of Gardeners
 2014: Lord High Commissioner, General Assembly of the Church of Scotland
 2017: Member, Court of Assistants, Worshipful Company of Fuellers
 2019: Master, Worshipful Company of Fuellers

Academic appointments
 2013 – present: Chancellor of the University of Bath

Honorary degrees
 1994: Honorary Doctor of Laws, University of Victoria
 2007: Honorary Doctor of Laws, University of Prince Edward Island
 2013: Honorary Doctor of Laws, University of Bath

Arms

Ancestry

Filmography

See also
 List of British princes

Notes

References

External links

 The Duke of Edinburgh at the official website of the British royal family
 The Earl of Wessex at the website of the Government of Canada
 

1964 births
Living people
20th-century British people
21st-century British people
Alumni of Jesus College, Cambridge
British Anglicans
British princes
British television presenters
British television producers
Chancellors of the University of Bath
Children of Elizabeth II
Edward
Dukes created by Charles III
Life peers created by Charles III
Wessex, Edward
Earls in the Peerage of the United Kingdom
Earls of Wessex
Earls of Forfar
English people of Danish descent
English people of German descent
English people of Greek descent
English people of Russian descent
English people of Scottish descent
Wessex
Honorary air commodores
Edward, Earl of Wessex
Knights Grand Cross of the Royal Victorian Order
Knights of the Garter
Members of the Saskatchewan Order of Merit
Lords High Commissioner to the General Assembly of the Church of Scotland
Military personnel from London
Edward
People educated at Gibbs School
People educated at Gordonstoun
People educated at Heatherdown School
People from Bagshot
People from Westminster
 
Edward
Royal Marines officers
Sons of monarchs
Younger sons of dukes